FlockDB is an open-source distributed, fault-tolerant graph database for managing wide but shallow network graphs. It was initially used by Twitter to store relationships between users, e.g. followings and favorites. FlockDB differs from other graph databases, e.g. Neo4j in that it is not designed for multi-hop graph traversal but rather for rapid set operations, not unlike the primary use-case for Redis sets. Since it is still in the process of being packaged for outside of Twitter use, the code is still very rough and hence there is no stable release available yet. FlockDB was posted on GitHub shortly after Twitter released its Gizzard framework, which it uses to query the FlockDB distributed datastore. The database is licensed under the Apache License.

Twitter no longer supports FlockDB.

See also

 Gizzard (Scala framework)

References

External links
 

Graph databases
2010 software
Free database management systems
Free software programmed in Java (programming language)
Java platform
Free software programmed in Scala
Fault-tolerant computer systems
Twitter